Fang Shimin, better known by his pen name Fang Zhouzi (born 28 September 1967), is a Chinese popular science writer who is primarily known for his campaign against pseudoscience and fraud in China.  President and co-director of New Threads(), a publication and website that promotes Chinese culture to the general public, Fang's aggressive campaign against allegations of academic fraud has been hotly debated; while Fang's works have appeared in many Chinese publications, various Chinese scholars have accused him of vigilantism and of using populist rhetoric in academic research. In 2019, due to the security fund incident, Fang Zhouzi's fraud associate Peng Jian lost both cases in the domestic finals. The verdict has been inquired, and the court ruled that Peng Jian will refund 3.1 million Yuan (USD $485247.03) donations and interest.

Biography
Fang Zhouzi (real name Fang Shimin) was born  in Zhangzhou, Fujian, China in September 1967.  Fang stated that his pen name, "Fang Zhouzi", is derived from a classical Chinese expression for "two ships sailing together"; in his case, the two ships stand for science and literature. Fang graduated from University of Science and Technology of China in 1990 and enrolled in Michigan State University, where he obtained a Ph.D. in biochemistry in 1995. Fang then worked at various institutions as a postdoctoral researcher in molecular genetics.

In the summer of 2010, after Fang questioned the efficacy of his surgical procedure and the accuracy of his curriculum vitae, urologist Xiao Chuanguo hired thugs to assault Fang in Beijing. Fang escaped with only minor cuts and bruises, but believed it was an attempt to kill him.  Xiao had sued Fang for libel five times in the past five years, winning one case, losing two and two further being undecided.  The dispute between Fang and Xiao dated to the founding of the New Threads website, when Fang had used the website to question the accuracy of Xiao's application to the Chinese Academy of Sciences.

Fang is married to Liu Juhua, a senior reporter at the state-controlled Xinhua News Agency.  Fang is a permanent resident of the United States.  When in the United States, he lives in San Diego.

Campaign against fraud

Fang is an active campaigner against what he perceives as fraud in the Chinese society. His anti-fraud efforts initially targeted academics, but later expanded to public figures in general.

Academia 
Fang is famous for his website, New Threads (established in 2001), that discusses poor-quality science in China and his efforts to expose poor scientific work, fraud and increase the profile of research ethics in China have received wide coverage.  Within the country there is no official body or procedure to handle complaints or examine allegations of fraud, and Fang started the website as an unofficial platform to expose instances. In 2006, a series of accusations and counter-accusations on Fang's website lead to significant media attention, criticisms of the self-conducted investigations by Chinese universities, and greater involvement by independent investigative bodies such as the Ministry of Science, Chinese Academy of Sciences or the National Natural Science Foundation of China in investigating allegations; though these institutions already have a role in investigating academic misconduct though their involvement is seen as ineffective.  In 2012 Fang shared the inaugural John Maddox Prize, given out by Nature and Sense about Science to "individuals who have promoted sound science and evidence on a matter of public interest, with an emphasis on those who have faced difficulty or opposition in doing so."  The announcement of Fang's presentation summarized his contributions, saying:

In a 2010 article in  The New York Times, Fang ascribed the problems with Chinese scientific integrity to the university system being run by state bureaucrats with little or no knowledge of the fields they administer, who base their decisions regarding research grants and career advancements on the number of scientific publications found, rather than their quality, where or if they were published.  According to Fang, other problems include fellow researchers who protect their peers, sometimes due to personal connections and sometimes due to a fear of being exposed themselves.  As of 2010 Fang's website had listed over 900 examples of academic fraud, which included presidents of universities and nationally known researchers.

Nonscientists

Fang has also accused nonscientists of fraud and plagiarism.  Fang questioned the qualifications and degrees of high-profile Chinese businessman Tang Jun, the former president of MSN China, who acquired his PhD degree from a diploma mill rather than the claimed California Institute of Technology. He also questioned former Google China president Kai-Fu Lee's intention for stating he was an associate professor at CMU in the Chinese version of his autobiography, while being actually an assistant professor. Lee responded by attributing the error to "nuances lost in translation".  Fang has accused Li Qun, a local Chinese official responsible for enforcing China's one-child policy, of falsely claiming to have worked for New Haven, Connecticut mayor John DeStefano Jr., and blogger, author and race-car driver Han Han of having his father ghost-writing for him, though Han denied the accusations.  In Jan 2012, Fang accused  Ping Fu, the Chinese-born American CEO of Geomagic, of fabricating stories in her memoir Bend, Not Break.  In response, Fu posted a series of corrections and clarifications. Fang continued to make personal attacks on Fu, and later expanded his criticism to American media, calling the Daily Beast "the shame of American journalism" by making what he considered as a biased report.

Criticism
Despite the intent to scrutinize and improve the honesty of scientific research in China, Fang's actions have been criticized for lacking transparency that would allow proper investigations. Many of the roughly 100 allegations posted on Fang's website each year are anonymous and lack details, and those accused have been unable to respond as a result.  On 8 May 2006, Fu Xinyuan, an Indiana University professor of immunology, published an open letter, signed by 120 overseas Chinese scholars, that called for due process and presumption of innocence in Chinese academic corruption cases. Furthermore, the letter criticized the practice of using populist rhetoric and personal attacks to affect institutional investigations. Although the letter did not explicitly mention Fang Zhouzi or his New Threads website, it was widely received as a rebuttal to Fang's campaigns. Fang denied Fu Xinyuan's claims, calling Fu's letter "contrary to the spirit of free speech". On 25 May 2006, Nature published a discussion of Fang's work, stating that while Fang's website had started a debate regarding academic integrity and scientific misconduct in China, areas where the country has admitted to "serious problems", the anonymous nature of the accusations posted on Fang's website reminded some of the similarly anonymous accusations that led to persecution of "government enemies" during the Cultural Revolution. Fang replied the Nature article, claiming that it is "absurd to compare Internet freedom of speech to the Cultural Revolution".

Controversies

Libel conviction
In 2006, Fang was convicted of libel by an Intermediate Court.

Plagiarism allegation
On March 30, 2011, Beijing-based newspaper Legal Weekly published an investigative report on Fang's alleged plagiarism. It found an article authored by Fang, published in the newspaper Economic Observer and included in two of Fang's books, plagiarized an online article posted in 2001 by Ying He. On a separate issue, Michigan State University professor Robert Root-Bernstein accused that Fang, in an online post in 1995, plagiarized one of his essays published by Oxford University Press. In response, Fang apologized for not crediting Prof. Root-Bernstein in the post, but denied he committed plagiarism or copyright infringement. Soon after, Fang accused Dr. Root-Bernstein of being a former member of a pseudo-science group.

Shenzhen TV investigation
The television station of Shenzhen, China began airing an investigative report titled Fang Zhouzi Revealed on February 23, 2012. The program examined various controversies surrounding Fang, notably his conflict with Dr. Xiao Chuanguo. Among others, it found that Fang's claim that "Xiao's surgery procedure had a zero success rate" was false, by interviewing patients who successfully underwent the surgery. Fang declined to be interviewed by the station, calling it "shameless". On his Weibo, Fang asked his audience to identify the program's presenter, suggesting she needs to "pay a price". Fang also posted the photo, name and CV of the director of the TV station, calling him to be investigated by authorities. The series was abruptly pulled off air on Feb 27.

Embezzlement allegation
On December 22, 2015, Wang Zhian, a China Central Television journalist, embarked upon a series of  investigative reports, exposing a suspected fundraising scam that involved Fang Shimin and his lawyer, Peng Jian. Back to September 2, 2010, a 'Security Fund' dedicated to Fang's personal safety was launched. Peng Jian initiated the fundraising project and has been in charge since then. Wang's investigation revealed that the alleged supervisory committee did not fulfill its primary responsibility; the internal auditing was almost in non-existence, and consequently, up to 179,392 yuan was embezzled from the fund to purchase a vehicle for Peng's law firm.

Views and essays

Scientific research in China
Commenting on the 2012 Nobel Prizes, Fang has stated that while China has made significant advances in technology, but has not caught up to Japan, Europe and the United States in science and research.  He stated that he does not expect China to produce a Nobel Prize-winning scientist for the next ten or more years.

Religion
Fang has strongly criticized Christianity, dedicating a section of his New Threads website to its criticism. In an interview, Fang described the religion as barbaric, violent, and a threat to Western and Chinese culture and Jehovah a "murderous demon". In an essay, he questioned the gospel accounts of the life of Jesus Christ, saying "there is no reliable historical record providing evidence that Jesus of Nazareth ever existed". Upon learning two teenage students died in a plane crash were heading for a summer camp organized by a Christian school, Fang commented: "why didn't (their) God protect them?"

Fang has also criticized Li Yi, a Taoist monk known for allegedly magical feats, for taking advantage of the poor public health infrastructure in China by claiming he could improve people's health.

Fang was the earliest critic of Falungong, a spiritual practice that was later banned in China.

Environmental Issues 
Fang is an ardent supporter of the use of genetically modified food, writing articles and producing a series of lectures debunking the perceived risks and misinformation surrounding GMF.

Fang vehemently denounces Greenpeace as an "anti-scientific organization", "a pseudo-environmental group".

Traditional Chinese medicine 
Fang asserts Traditional Chinese medicine is superstitious pseudoscience and referred to its practitioners as "charlatans". He is one of the most vocal contemporary critics of TCM in China. Fang published a book systematically debunking TCM's theory and practice.

Awards 
In November 2012, Fang was joint winner, with Simon Wessely, of the combined Nature and Sense about Science inaugural John Maddox Prize for standing up for science.

References

External links 
 New Threads 
 Fang Zhouzi's blog 
 Interview by New Scientist

Chinese technology writers
Michigan State University alumni
1967 births
Living people
People from Zhangzhou
People's Republic of China science writers
Scientists from Fujian
Writers from Fujian
Critics of Falun Gong
Critics of Christianity
Chinese Internet celebrities
John Maddox Prize recipients